Doane Peak is in the northern Teton Range, Grand Teton National Park, Wyoming. The peak is located west of and across Jackson Lake from Colter Bay Village. The scenic Waterfalls Canyon is immediately northeast of the peak, but there are no maintained trails in the area. The peak is named for Lt. Gustavus Cheyney Doane.

References

Mountains of Grand Teton National Park
Mountains of Wyoming
Mountains of Teton County, Wyoming